The Asia Pacific Screen Award for Performance by an Actress has been given annually by the Asia Pacific Screen Academy since 2007.

Winners and nominees

2000s

2010s

See also
 Asian Film Award for Best Actress

External links
 

Best Performance by an Actress
Lists of films by award
Awards for actresses